Winn-Dixie Stores, Inc., styled as Winn✓Dixie, is an American supermarket chain headquartered in Jacksonville, Florida. Winn-Dixie operates more than 546 stores in Florida, Alabama, Louisiana, Georgia, and Mississippi. The company has had its present name since 1955 and can trace its roots back to 1925.

Winn-Dixie is known for its private label Chek brand soft drinks, which are produced in over 20 different flavors plus diet and caffeine-free varieties—one of the widest assortments. Winn-Dixie has been known as "The Beef People" throughout its lifetime.  In its advertising and print media, Winn-Dixie used slogans such as “We’re Right For You” starting in 1984, “America’s Supermarket” from 1986 until 2001, “The Real Deal” from 2002 to 2004, and since 2018, “It’s a Winn Win!” Winn-Dixie has also been known for its use of the brand promises of "Fresh Checked Every Day" for its Jacksonville, Florida locations, "Getting Better All The Time" in its locations in Central Florida, "El Sabor De Tu País", or "The Flavor Of Your Country", in its Miami area stores, and "Local Flavor Since 1956" in its Louisiana area stores.

Winn-Dixie was listed in the S&P 500 and had been traded on the New York Stock Exchange under the ticker symbol "WIN" since February 18, 1952, prior to filing for Chapter 11 bankruptcy in 2005.  The company was traded under the symbol "WINN" on the NASDAQ before its purchase. The bankruptcy left the chain with fewer stores than it had in the late 1960s.

On December 19, 2011, BI-LO, another Southeastern supermarket chain, announced plans to purchase Winn-Dixie. On March 9, 2012, Winn-Dixie became a wholly owned subsidiary of Southeastern Grocers, and Winn-Dixie's ticker symbol was removed from the NASDAQ. Southeastern Grocers announced at the time of acquisition that the merged company would be based at Winn-Dixie's headquarters in Jacksonville.  BI-LO had previously been based in Greenville, South Carolina.  In 2015, Bi-Lo Holdings changed its name to Southeastern Grocers and remained in Jacksonville.

History

Beginnings
Winn-Dixie was founded and built up by William Milton Davis and his sons Artemus Darius Davis, James Elsworth Davis, Milton Austin Davis and Tine Wayne Davis. William Davis started in business in Burley, Idaho, where he bought a general store in 1914 that he later renamed Davis Mercantile. As was common then, he sold most goods on credit. The advent of cash-only grocery stores in the 1920s hurt Davis' business as the new stores offered lower prices and larger selections.

In 1925, William Davis borrowed $10,000 from his father and moved to Miami, Florida, where he purchased the Rockmoor Grocery. In 1927, the company was renamed Table Supply, and four more stores were opened. In 1931, the Davis family bought the Lively Stores chain for $10,000, to create a chain of 33 Table Supply stores across Florida from Miami to Tampa. William Milton Davis died in 1934, leaving his four sons in charge of the company.

In 1939, the Davis brothers bought 51 percent of Winn & Lovett, a chain of 73 stores. In 1944, the brothers bought the remainder of Winn & Lovett and merged the two chains under the Winn & Lovett name.  The company headquarters moved to Jacksonville. Winn & Lovett purchased the Steiden Stores chain of 31 stores in Kentucky in 1945 as well as Margaret Ann Stores, with 46 stores in Florida, in 1949. In 1952, Winn & Lovett became the first industrial corporation based in Florida to be listed on the New York Stock Exchange (NYSE).

Acquisitions
Winn & Lovett continued to grow by acquiring other chains. Penney Stores in Mississippi, Ballentine Stores and Eden Stores in South Carolina were all acquired in 1955. Winn & Lovett also bought the 117-store Dixie Home chain, and they changed its name to Winn-Dixie.

In 1956, Winn-Dixie bought Ketner-Milner Stores in North Carolina, H. G. Hill Stores in Louisiana and Mississippi, as well as King Stores in Georgia.

In 1967, Winn-Dixie bought the City Markets chain in the Bahamas, effectively extending their reach into the Caribbean.  Operating 12 stores through its domestic subsidiary, W-D (Bahamas) Limited's competitors included the domestic Super Value Food Stores and Grand Union's own Caribbean operations until it sold the chain to Bahamian investors in 2006.

In 1976, Winn-Dixie purchased the Buddies Supermarket chain, based in Fort Worth, Texas, expanding the Winn-Dixie moniker into Texas, Oklahoma, and New Mexico.

In 1995, Winn-Dixie expanded with the purchase of the Cincinnati-based Thriftway Food Drug. In 2000, it acquired Jitney Jungle.

Involvements
Although Winn-Dixie Stores (and its predecessor Winn & Lovett) has been publicly traded since 1952, the Davis family has always maintained control of the corporation.  As of February 2005, when the company entered bankruptcy, the heirs of William Milton Davis still held about 35 percent of Winn-Dixie stock.

The Davis brothers also became involved in Florida politics, supporting conservative causes. It is reported that their financial support helped George Smathers beat incumbent U.S. Senator Claude Pepper in 1950.  Former U.S. Treasury Secretary Donald Regan is reported to have said of his financial guru, James E. Davis: "When J.E. calls, I listen." It is reported that after reading Booker T. Washington's Up From Slavery, James E. Davis began a program of Winn-Dixie supporting historically black colleges and universities.

The Davis brothers endowed the Stetson University School of Business Administration with a building, Davis Hall, which was dedicated in 1967.  On the dedicatory plaque inside the building, below the names of the donors, was the inscription, "Learn management that you may produce or distribute goods and services to improve the living for the people and produce a good return on invested capital for investors."

In the 1990s, Winn Dixie gave a generous contribution to the Boy Scouts of America of the Central Florida Council, resulting in the renaming of Camp La-No-Che to Winn-Dixie Scout Reservation. However, when Winn-Dixie encountered financial difficulties and could not sustain its promised contribution, it released Central Florida Council from its obligation to retain the name, which has since been changed.

Winn-Dixie has long been involved in Jacksonville, including a former sponsorship as the official supermarket of the Jacksonville Jaguars of the National Football League (NFL).

Financial difficulties
Winn-Dixie Stores closed all 76 stores it operated in Texas and Oklahoma at the end of its 2002 fiscal year ending on June 26. In April 2004, Winn-Dixie announced the closure of 156 stores, including all 111 stores located in the Midwest. Included were over 20 stores that had operated under the Thriftway name in and around Cincinnati purchased by Winn-Dixie in 1995. Another 40 stores in the Atlanta area were converted to the Save Rite Grocery Warehouse brand, as an alternative to store closure. Later that year in October, the company sold 10 stores in North Carolina and Virginia to Salisbury-based Food Lion, with the stores in Clarksville, Danville, Martinsville, South Hill, Stanleytown, and Elizabethtown converting to the Food Lion name.

SaveRite
Winn-Dixie discontinued its use of the name SaveRite in 2011.

2005 bankruptcy
On February 22, 2005, Winn-Dixie filed for bankruptcy. On June 21, it announced the sale or closure of 326 stores.  As part of the restructuring, the company pulled out of the Carolinas, Tennessee, Texas, and Virginia. Once the restructuring was completed, Winn-Dixie's footprint was reduced to the Bahamas, and five of the Deep South states—almost all of Florida and Alabama, the southeastern half of Louisiana, the southeast corner of Mississippi, and the southwest and coastal corners of Georgia. With the closures, Winn-Dixie now had fewer stores than it had in the 1950s.

On February 28, 2006, it was announced that 35 more stores were to be sold or closed within the coming months, with the Central and South Florida areas being the most affected. On March 31, 2006, it was announced that the chain would sell its 12 Bahamian locations, which had been operated by a wholly owned subsidiary, W-D Limited, under the names City Market and Winn-Dixie.

BI-LO acquisition

On June 29, 2006, Winn-Dixie announced that it had filed a plan of reorganization with the U.S. Bankruptcy Court for the Middle District of Florida. The company emerged from Chapter 11 protection on November 21, 2006, in a much stronger financial position.  Upon emerging from bankruptcy in 2006, Winn-Dixie made great strides toward success which included a steadfast effort to modernize its existing store base while focusing on new locations for the future.

On December 19, 2011, Winn-Dixie agreed to be sold to BI-LO for $530 million.  As part of the deal, Winn-Dixie became a subsidiary of BI-LO although its stores would continue to operate under the Winn-Dixie name.

As of March 9, 2012, Winn-Dixie became part of Bi-Lo Holdings, the parent company of both BI-LO and Winn-Dixie, ending 67 years of Davis family ownership. The combined company operates 750 stores in seven southeastern states, employing approximately 63,000 team members. The merged company is based at Winn-Dixie's headquarters in Jacksonville.

On October 8, 2013, all remaining Sweetbay Supermarket locations were rebranded as Winn-Dixie. Bi-Lo Holdings changed its name to Southeastern Grocers in 2015.

In May 2017, Southeastern Grocers announced the closing of eight Winn-Dixie stores as part of a corporate-wide closure of 23 locations along with the elimination of some department lead roles at stores. In July 2017, it was announced that Southeastern Grocers would debut the Harveys brand in the Central and West Florida markets with the conversion of 7 Winn-Dixie stores. In October 2017, Southeastern announced that 3 more West Florida Winn-Dixie stores would be converted to the Harveys brand as well as  converting an additional 5 South Florida stores to Fresco y Más in November 2017.

2018 bankruptcy
In February 2018, it was announced that Southeastern Grocers was selling eight Winn-Dixie locations in south Louisiana to Texas-based, Brookshire Grocery Company as well as an additional three Mississippi and four New Orleans market locations to Baton Rouge-based, Shoppers Value Foods.

On March 15, 2018, Southeastern Grocers announced they would file a plan of reorganization under Chapter 11 by the end of March. According to the company, the restructuring would decrease overall debt levels by over $500 million. Under this plan, 35 Winn-Dixie stores would close, along with an additional 59 stores across the BI-LO, Harveys, and Fresco y Más brands.

On March 22, 2018, it was announced that the Orange Beach, Alabama Winn-Dixie location was being sold to Rouses Markets. On March 28, 2018, Southeastern agreed to sell three Winn-Dixie stores in northeast Alabama to wholesaler Mitchell Grocery Corp on behalf of two of its current customers, Johnson's Giant Foods and The D'Alessandro Organization LLC, while the Winn-Dixie location in Atmore, Alabama was being acquired by Ramey's. An additional three BI-LO locations in South Carolina along with three Harveys locations in Georgia would be sold to three independent Piggly Wiggly store owners. The deals are in conjunction with the restructuring support agreement revealed by Southeastern Grocers. On March 31, 2018, it was announced that the Andalusia, Alabama Winn-Dixie location's lease and equipment would be purchased by a Piggly Wiggly franchisee. On May 1, 2018, an independent Piggly Wiggly operator announced that they would reopen the Montgomery, Alabama Winn-Dixie location that closed as part of the original restructuring plan. Subsequently, in 2020, Southeastern Grocers announced its plans to close its Montgomery location on the Eastern Boulevard. This was likely due to a combination of factors, the two biggest being reportedly theft and a remodel of the nearby Sturbridge Village location. Workers affected by the closure of this location were eligible to transfer to either Sturbridge or Carter Hill.

In May 2018, Southeastern Grocers' restructuring plan was confirmed by a U.S. Bankruptcy judge in Delaware. At the end of that month, Southeastern Grocers announced that it had completed its financial restructuring and was emerging from bankruptcy. As part of the restructuring, $522 million in debt was exchanged for equity in Southeastern Grocers, though it was not announced who was receiving the equity shares. Southeastern Grocers exited bankruptcy with 575 stores in seven states, down from 704 locations. They also announced a planned remodels of 100 stores in 2018.

In February 2019, Southeastern Grocers announced plans to close 22 locations in Florida, Georgia, North Carolina, and South Carolina. This round of closures included 7 Winn-Dixie locations.

COVID-19 response 

The immediate response began in late March 2020, with every register fitted with a plexiglass shield that separates the cashier and customer from each other. Floor markers were placed 6 feet apart in register lines and at self-checkout in compliance with CDC guidelines for physical distancing between customers. The cash registers were required to be cleaned every hour, and the entire front end must be cleaned every 4 hours. The service desk and pharmacy were also fitted with plexiglass to ensure shopper safety. Associates disinfected cart handles as they are returned to the store, and disinfectant wipes are present at the front of stores if customers want additional cleaning. The self-serve wing and salad bar were temporarily converted into associate manned stations to reduce the number of people touching the serving utensils. The pharmacy department offered flexible hours and curbside pickup or home delivery to ensure customers could get the prescriptions they need in the safest way possible.

In April through June, many stores enacted a “senior hour” to allow senior shoppers time to get their needed goods while limiting the number of people in the store. In addition, in-store occupancy was regulated. Winn Dixie partnered with ShipT in 2018 to provide grocery delivery to customer homes, and promotion of this service was augmented at the start of the pandemic. In addition, Winn Dixie offered curbside pickup for grocery orders and prescriptions placed through the app.

Employees have been required to wear masks beginning in March 2020 at the start of the pandemic and were encouraged to wear gloves. Hand sanitizer was provided at all cash registers and employees were required to sanitize between customers. Starting July 27, 2020, Winn Dixie began enforcing a mask policy according to Joe Caldwell, the Director of Corporate Communications and Government Affairs in which all customers entering the store were required to wear a mask. Customers who were not compliant, even after offered a mask, were asked to leave the store.

As of May 2021, customers and employees who have received the two doses of the Pfizer or Moderna vaccine for COVID-19 are no longer required to wear masks in stores.

Starting in early February 2021, Winn-Dixie locations began receiving doses of the COVID-19 vaccine, and continue to offer them to the present day. Initially, customers were required to schedule an appointment due to limited supplies, but now most, if not all locations offer walk-in appointments. Additionally, customers and employees are given $10 to $15 off groceries as an incentive to get the vaccine.

Locations
As of November 28, 2022, Winn-Dixie operates more than 546 grocery stores in Florida, Alabama, Louisiana, Georgia, and Mississippi.

Brands

Winn-Dixie has run over 60 private label brands over the years. In 2003 the company cut the number down to a three-tier system of brands: the "Prestige" brand for upscale private label products, "Winn-Dixie" for its mainstream items, and "Thrifty Maid" for its value items. In 2007, all three brands received redesigned packaging with plans to replace the "Prestige" brand with "Winn & Lovett". In 2010, Winn-Dixie replaced its value-centered brand Thrifty Maid with "ValueTime".  ValueTime was replaced with Clear Value in 2012. The brands of "Clear Value", for the budget-minded shopper, "Winn-Dixie", which is designed to be as good as or better than national brands, and "Winn & Lovett", the premium, top-tier label, are the current private labels the organization uses store-wide.   These brands were on numerous products in almost all departments. Beginning in 2016, SE Grocers began to transition to a unified private label brand under the "SE Grocers" brand, with 4 different tiers.  Currently, Winn-Dixie's private label brands are as follows:

SE Grocers Essentials, a budget-priced brand on staple items 
SE Grocers, a mid-market private label brand equivalent to popular, national brands on everyday items
SE Grocers Naturally Better, a natural, organic, and health conscious brandSE Grocers Prestige, a higher-end line offering more gourmet, exclusive, and health-conscious itemsChek, a soda brandTopCare, the company's health and beauty aid lineWhiskers & Tails, pet food and suppliesKuddles'', baby food, diapers, and everyday items

In early 2013, BI-LO phased out its own private label soft drinks in its BI-LO stores in favor of the popular "Chek" brand.

As of May 2017, Winn-Dixie employs more than 38,000 associates who serve customers in approximately 500 grocery stores, 150 liquor stores, and 280 in-store pharmacies.

In 2020 Southeast Grocers began the Romay Davis Belonging, Inclusion and Diversity Grant with the goal of funding minority-supporting organizations.

References

External links

 
 

Companies based in Jacksonville, Florida
Economy of the Southeastern United States
Supermarkets of the United States
American companies established in 1925
Retail companies established in 1925
Companies that filed for Chapter 11 bankruptcy in 2005
Companies that filed for Chapter 11 bankruptcy in 2018
1925 establishments in Florida
Companies formerly listed on the Nasdaq